Rock Against Communism (RAC) was the name of white power rock concerts in the United Kingdom in the late 1970s and early 1980s, and has since become the catch-all term for music with racist lyrics as well as a specific genre of rock music derived from Oi!. The lyrics can focus on racism and antisemitism, though this depends on the band.

History
The Rock Against Communism movement originated in the United Kingdom in late 1978 with far right activists associated with the National Front (NF). It was intended to counter the Rock Against Racism organisation. The first RAC concert was in Leeds, Yorkshire, England in 1978, featuring the Nazi punk bands The Dentists and The Ventz. RAC held one concert in 1979 and another in spring 1983, which was headlined by Skrewdriver, a white power rock band led by Ian Stuart Donaldson. After that, RAC concerts were held more often. They were often headlined by Skrewdriver and featured other white power bands, such as Skullhead and No Remorse. In the mid-1980s, summer concerts were often held at the Suffolk home of Edgar Griffin, a Conservative Party activist and father of Nick Griffin, an NF organiser who later became the national chair of the British National Party. By the late 1980s, the RAC name had given way to the White Noise Club (another NF-based group), and later Blood and Honour, which was set up by Donaldson when they fell out with the NF leadership. As hardcore punk music became more popular in the 1990s and 2000s, many white power bands took on a more hardcore-influenced sound.

See also
National Socialist black metal
Panzerfaust Records
Resistance Records

Footnotes

1978 introductions
Fascism in the United Kingdom
Neo-fascism
Neo-Nazi music
White nationalism in the United Kingdom
Anti-communist organizations
Racism in the United Kingdom